Gilbert Creek may refer to:

Gilbert Creek, West Virginia, an unincorporated community and census-designated place
Gilbert Creek (West Virginia), a stream